Hilario or Hilário can be both a given name and surname. Notable people with the name include:

Given name
Hilario (1905–1989), Spanish footballer and manager
Hilário (born 1939), Portuguese footballer and manager
Hilário (born 1975), Portuguese footballer
Hilario Barrero (born 1948), Spanish writer
Hilario Candela (1934-2022), Cuban-born American architect
Hilario Davide Jr. (born 1935), Filipino ambassador
Hilário Maximiniano Antunes Gurjão (1820–1869), Brazilian general 
Hilário Leal (born 1974), Portuguese footballer
Hilario López (1907–1965), Mexican footballer
Hilario Zapata (born 1958), Panamanian boxer

Surname
Jhong Hilario (born 1976), Filipino actor and dancer
Nenê (born 1982 as Maybyner Rodney Hilário), Brazilian basketball player

See also
Hilario, cognomen, the third name of an ancient Roman
Hilarios Karl-Heinz Ungerer (born 1941), German bishop
 Hilario (album), the Inbreds debut album

Hilarion (name)
Hilary (name)

Spanish masculine given names